Hal Rayle (born January 4, 1955) is an American voice actor. He has done many roles for both animated series and live action movies.

Career
Rayle has had a number of voice acting jobs over his career. Rayle's animated series roles include Miss Piggy, Gonzo & Animal for the Little Muppet Monsters. Raphael in Teenage Mutant Ninja Turtles, the Tin Man in The Wizard of Oz television series, Einstein the Dog and 65 other voices in Universal Animation's Back to the Future, Riddler's Henchman #1 in Batman: The Animated Series,  Inspector Clouseau in The Pink Panther series, Reflex and Howler in Pound Puppies and the Legend of Big Paw, Lieutenant Commander Steele in SWAT Kats: The Radical Squadron, Pipes, Snarl and Shrapnel in Transformers, Deep Six in the Sunbow/Marvel G.I. Joe series, Arzon and the Wise Owl in Visionaries: Knights of the Magical Light, and Doyle Cleverlobe in Galaxy High.

Rayle also provided the voice of the Predator creature in Predator 2. Rayle provided the voice of Marvin the Martian in the commercials for Air Jordan.

In the live action film Ghoulies II, he was the voice for all of the Ghoulies. Rayle also voiced "Virgil" the Chimpanzee in Project-X, the "Koala Bear" in The Adventures of Ford Fairlane and the "Rats" in Total Recall. Rayle has provided the voice of Alfred Hitchcock & the Hal-9000 Computer for Universal Studio's - Hollywood/Orlando.

Personal life
Rayle graduated from Ball State University in 1977 with a degree in Telecommunications, Cinematography, and History. Rayle is married to actress Maggie Roswell, and they adopted a girl in 1993, whom they named Spenser. They own and operate a voiceover studio, AudioRnR, near their home in Burbank, California. Rayle is a registered Democrat and adheres to the Catholic faith.

Partial filmography

 G.I. Joe: A Real American Hero - Deep Six
 The Transformers (1984) - Pipes, Snarl, Shrapnel
 The Ewok Adventure (1984) - Weechee (voice)
 Snorks (1985) - (Additional Voices)
 Star Worms II: Attack of the Pleasure Pods (1985) - Replacement (voice)
 Little Muppet Monsters (1985) - Miss Piggy, Gonzo, Animal
 Small Wonder (1985) - Parrot
 The A-Team (1985) - Chuck-a-Luck the Chicken
 The Transformers: The Movie (1986) - Shrapnel, Snarl (voice)
 Teenage Mutant Ninja Turtles (1987) - Raphael (European Side Season)
 Pound Puppies and the Legend of Big Paw (1988) - Howler / Reflex (voice)
 Superman (1988) - Additional Voices
 Ghoulies II (1988) - Ghoulies (voice, uncredited)
 Predator 2 (1990) - The Predator (voice, uncredited)
 The Wizard of Oz (1990) - Tin Man
 Toxic Crusaders (1991) - Bonehead, Dr. Bender
 Fievel's American Tails (1992) - Clint Mousewood
 The Pink Panther (1993) - Charlie Ant, Blue Aardvark (occasional understudy; season two), Additional Voices
 SWAT Kats: The Radical Squadron (1993) - Lieutenant Commander Steele
 Camp California Where the Music Never Ends (1993)
 The High Crusade (1994) - Alien 1 (voice)

References

External links
 Official Website
 

Living people
American male voice actors
Male actors from Denver
Place of birth missing (living people)
20th-century American actors
21st-century American actors
Colorado Democrats
California Democrats
American Roman Catholics
1955 births